The list of feature films with LGBT characters is split across the following pages:
 List of feature films with lesbian characters
 List of feature films with gay characters
 List of feature films with bisexual characters
 List of feature films with transgender characters
 List of film franchises with LGBT characters

See also 
 List of animated films with LGBT characters
 List of made-for-television films with LGBT characters

Lists of lists
Lists of LGBT-related films